Udupi Lok Sabha constituency was a former Lok Sabha constituency in Karnataka.  This seat came into existence in 1957. With the implementation of the delimitation of parliamentary constituencies in 2008, it ceased to exist.

History
The former Constituency of Udupi Lok Sabha constituency was South Kanara (North) Lok Sabha constituency, which came into existence in 1951. With the implementation of States Reorganisation Act, 1956, it ceased to exist.
After South Canara District of erstwhile Madras State got merged with Mysore State in 1956, that seat ceased to exist and was replaced by Udipi Lok Sabha constituency.

Assembly segments
Udupi Lok Sabha constituency comprised the following eight Karnataka Legislative Assembly segments:
 Bantwal
 Surathkal
 Kaup
 Udupi
 Brahmavar
 Kundapur
 Baindur
 Moodabidri

The Legislative Assembly segments of Baindur, Kundapur, Brahmavar, Udupi, and Kaup were in Udupi district, and the Legislative Assembly constituencies of Moodabidri, Surathkal and Bantwal were in Dakshina Kannada district. After delimitation process done by Election Commission of India in 2008 A.D., Baindur became part of Shimoga constituency and Brahmavar ceased to exist.

Members of Parliament

See also
 Udupi Chikmagalur Lok Sabha constituency
 South Kanara (North) Lok Sabha constituency
 South Kanara (South) Lok Sabha constituency
 Mangalore Lok Sabha constituency
 Udupi district
 List of former constituencies of the Lok Sabha

Notes

Udupi district
Former constituencies of the Lok Sabha
2008 disestablishments in India
Constituencies disestablished in 2008
Former Lok Sabha constituencies of Karnataka